Atchutapuram is a mandal in Anakapalli district, in the Indian state of Andhra Pradesh.

Transport
APSRTC routes

References 

Neighbourhoods in Visakhapatnam
Mandals in Anakapalli district